Władysław Kowalski (24 February 1936 – 29 October 2017) was a Polish actor. He appeared in nearly 100 films and television shows between 1957 and 2015.

Selected filmography
 Samson (1961)
 Dreszcze (1981)
 Escape from the 'Liberty' Cinema (1990)
 The Boy on the Galloping Horse (2006)
 Katyń (2007)
 Louise's Garden (2008)
 Body (2015)

References

External links

1936 births
2017 deaths
Polish male film actors
People from Tomaszów Lubelski County
Recipient of the Meritorious Activist of Culture badge